Tamahaq (Tahaggart Tamahaq, Tamahaq Tahaggart) is the only known Northern Tuareg language, spoken in Algeria, western Libya and northern Niger. It varies little from the Southern Tuareg languages of the Aïr Mountains, Azawagh and Adagh. The differences mostly consist of sound substitutions, such as Tamahaq instead of Tamajaq or Tamasheq. This language is “one of the sister languages spoken by the inhabitants of many districts of the Atlas range of mountains from Egypt to the Western shores of Marocco, and which are all included in the general term Berber.”

Orthography 
The Tuareg write from right to left, like other abjads such as Hebrew and Arabic. The alphabet is called “Tifinagh” and contains 25 letters

Phonology

vowels

Consonants 

There are 8 double letters, which help with pronunciation, because short vowels are not indicated in written Tamashek, and they aid in being able to discern whether there are long or short vowels:

Grammar

Nouns: 
Tamachek nouns are gendered, masculine and feminine, and numbered as singular and plural.  

General rules of Thumb:  

-Singular Masculine nouns begin with one of the vowel sounds : a, i, ou, e. 

-Plural masculine nouns begin with the sound i. 

-Feminine singular and plural nouns begin a T. 

There are a few exceptions to these rules:

 Certain masculine names, no matter whether plural or singular, begin with a consonant e.g. ⵢⵜ (ti) - father 
 Some singular Masculine names begin with ou and this sound follows through in the plural nouns too e.g. ⵓ (oul) - heart  
 If a masculine singular noun begins with a short sound, it may be represented as é, and this rule follows through to the plural: e.g. ⵓ  (élou) sing.-  ⵏⵓⵍ (élouan). 
 Some plural masculine names begin with the sound a: e.g. ⵏⵓⵔ (araouen) (new born babies) 
 Some feminine names (plural or singular) don’t begin with a t: e.g. ⴰⵎⵜⵓ (oult ma) – sister / ⴰⵎ (ma)- mother  

We can also obtain feminine names by adding a T to the beginning and end of a masculine name (although this is not always the case, there are exceptions).

Varieties 
There are three main varieties of Tamahaq:
Tahaggart, spoken around the Ahaggar Mountains in southern Algeria by the Kel Ahaggar confederation
Ajjer, spoken by the Kel Ajjer confederation
Ghat, spoken around Djanet in southeast Algeria and Ghat in Libya.

According to Blench (2006), Tahaggart and Ghat are distinct Tuareg languages.

References

Tuareg languages
Berbers in Algeria
Berbers in Libya
Berbers in Niger
Languages of Algeria
Languages of Libya
Languages of Niger